Nicola Joanne Wagner (born 23 July 1953) is a New Zealand teacher, businesswoman and politician. She represented the Christchurch Central electorate for the New Zealand National Party in the New Zealand Parliament.

Early life and career
Born in Christchurch, Wagner received a teaching degree from Christchurch College of Education, a BA from the University of Canterbury, and an MBA from Massey University. After working for a time as a teacher, she entered the business world, and established a successful fashion marketing company and later an internet marketing business. She was an internet pioneer establishing firstly  FashioNZ a website to support the  New Zealand fashion industry and  GardenNZ for the gardening industry.

Politics

Environment Canterbury (ECan) councillor Peter Yeoman died in October 2002. The resulting by-election was held over when councillor Neil Cherry resigned shortly after over health concerns. Wagner and Alec Neill won the April 2003 by-election held in the Christchurch West constituency. There was concern whether Wagner could do justice to both being a regional councillor and a member of parliament when she received a high list ranking for the 2005 general election. Wagner retired from ECan at the 2007 local elections.

She appeared on the National party list at 37th place for the 2002 general election, which was not enough to win a seat. She contested the Christchurch Central electorate for the National Party in the 2005 general election. While Wagner did not win the electorate, her high list placing (28th, the third highest placing for a newcomer behind Tim Groser and Chris Finlayson) ensured her election to Parliament. Prior to her election, Wagner had endorsed the NZ Flag.com Trust's campaign for a referendum on New Zealand's flag, stating "Our flag should celebrate our nation's identity and our special foot-print on this earth. We will always respect and cherish our links with the past that are represented in our present flag but a young country needs to create a strong vision for its future." In her first term in Parliament she sat on the Justice and Electoral select committee and later the Local Government and Environment Committee.

In 2005, Wagner voted for the controversial Marriage (Gender Clarification) Amendment Bill 2005, a bill which would have amended the Marriage Act to define marriage as only between a man and a woman.

Recontesting Christchurch Central in the 2008 general election, Wagner drastically cut Labour's majority in both the electorate and the party vote, reducing the candidate majority from 7,836 to 936. She remained in Parliament, having been re-elected through the National Party list.

In 2009, Wagner voted against the Misuse of Drugs (Medicinal Cannabis) Amendment Bill, a bill aimed at amending the Misuse of Drugs Act  so that cannabis could be used for medical purposes.

She contested Christchurch Central for the third time in the 2011 general election and won the seat off Labour with a 47-vote majority, after special votes broke an exact tie between her and incumbent MP Brendon Burns on election night. This marked the first time National had ever held the Christchurch Central electorate since its creation in 1946.

Wagner was the Chair of the Local Government and Environment Select Committee and sat on the Maori Affairs Select Committee. She also chaired the BlueGreens Caucus Committee and the Arts, Culture and Heritage Caucus Committee. In 2013 she was appointed Parliamentary Private Secretary to Gerry Brownlee and Nick Smith in the Christchurch Earthquake Recovery and Conservation portfolios, respectively.

When the draft boundaries were published for consultation, Wagner declared the electorate as more Labour focussed and "unwinnable" due to the proposed loss of more affluent suburbs. When the final boundaries were released in April 2014, Wagner vowed to stand again and fight for re-election. Wagner won the seat with a majority of 2420 at the 2014 general election.

In September 2014, Wagner defended employing Simon Lusk, a controversial political strategist mentioned in Dirty Politics, claiming New Zealand's grassroots campaigning is "very much amateurish".

On 8 October 2014, Wagner was appointed a Minister outside of Cabinet, holding the portfolios of Customs, Disability Issues, Associate Canterbury Earthquake Recovery, and Associate Conservation. She is ranked 23 on the party list.

On 14 June 2017, Wagner made a comment on Twitter that she'd "rather be out on the harbour" while mentioning that she was attending disability meetings, attracting online criticism. Labour and Green politicians commented on the issue, stating "It really makes me question her commitment to the disability community if she'd rather be out on the harbour than in meetings with them."

After losing her seat in the 2017 election to Labour's Duncan Webb, she stayed on as a list MP, but decided not to stand again for the 2020 election.

References

External links

Nicky Wagner MP official site
Profile at National party

1953 births
Living people
New Zealand National Party MPs
University of Canterbury alumni
Massey University alumni
New Zealand women in business
Women members of the New Zealand House of Representatives
New Zealand list MPs
New Zealand MPs for Christchurch electorates
Unsuccessful candidates in the 2002 New Zealand general election
Members of the New Zealand House of Representatives
21st-century New Zealand politicians
21st-century New Zealand women politicians
Candidates in the 2017 New Zealand general election
Christchurch College of Education alumni
Canterbury regional councillors